Noah Departure 2022 was a professional wrestling event promoted by CyberFight's sub-brand Pro Wrestling Noah. It took place on August 5, 2022, in Tokyo, Japan, at the Korakuen Hall. The event aired on CyberAgent's AbemaTV online linear television service and CyberFight's streaming service Wrestle Universe.

Background

Storylines
The event featured eight professional wrestling matches that resulted from scripted storylines, where wrestlers portrayed villains, heroes, or less distinguishable characters in the scripted events that built tension and culminated in a wrestling match or series of matches.

Event
The evening started with Masa Kitamiya and Mohammed Yone picking a victory over Masaaki Mochizuki and Shuhei Taniguchi. Next, Kai Fujimura and Stinger (Yoshinari Ogawa & Yuya Susumu) defeated Los Perros del Mal de Japón (Eita, Nosawa Rongai and Super Crazy) in six-man tag team action. In the third bout, Kongo's Katsuhiko Nakajima and Manabu Soya defeated Anthony Greene and Stallion Rogers. The fourth confrontation saw Daisuke Harada, Ninja Mack and Seiki Yoshioka overcoming the team of Atsushi Kotoge, Dante Leon and Yo-Hey. Next, Alejandro, El Hijo del Santo, Kaito Kiyomiya and Último Dragón defeated Kongo (Hajime Ohara, Hi69, Kenoh and Tadasuke). In the sixth match, Kinya Okada defeated Yoshiki Inamura to obtain a spot in the blocks of the 2022 N-1 Victory. In the semi main event, Go Shiozaki, Naomichi Marufuji and Takashi Sugiura defeated Daiki Inaba, Masato Tanaka and Satoshi Kojima.

The main event portraited the confrontation between Hayata and Shuji Kondo for the GHC Junior Heavyweight Championship. Hayata successfully retained the title and secured the third consecutive defense.

Results

References

External links
Pro Wrestling Noah official website

Pro Wrestling Noah
CyberAgent
2022 in professional wrestling
December 2022 events in Japan
Professional wrestling in Tokyo
Pro Wrestling Noah shows